This is a list of cities, towns and villages in the ceremonial county of Wiltshire, England.

A

 Ablington
 Addeston
 Alcombe
 Aldbourne
 Alderbury
 Alderton
 All Cannings
 Allington (near Chippenham)
 Allington (near Devizes)
 Allington (near Salisbury)
 Alton Barnes
 Alton Priors
 Alvediston
 Amesbury
 Ansty
 Ashley
 Ashton Gifford
 Ashton Keynes
 Asserton
 Atworth
 Aughton
 Avebury
 Avon
 Avoncliff
 Axford

B

 Badbury
 Badbury Wick
 Bagshot, Wiltshire
 Bapton 
 Barford St Martin 
 Barrow Street
 Bathampton
 Baverstock
 Baydon
 Beanacre
 Beardwell
 Bearfield 
 Beechingstoke
 Bemerton
 Berryfield
 Berwick Bassett
 Berwick St James 
 Berwick St John
 Berwick St Leonard
 Beversbrook
 Biddesden
 Biddestone
 Bigley
 Birdbush
 Bishop Fowley
 Bishops Cannings 
 Bishopstone near Salisbury
 Bishopstone near Swindon
 Bishopstrow
 Bishops Cannings
 Blackland
 Blagdon Hill
 Blunsdon St Andrew
 Bodenham
 Bonham
 Boreham
 Boscombe
 Bottlesford
 Bowerchalke
 Bowerhill
 Bowood House
 Box 
 Boyton
 Bradenstoke
 Bradford Leigh
 Bradford on Avon 
 Bratton 
 Braydon
 Bremhill
 Bridmore
 Brigmerston
 Brinkworth
 Britford
 Brixton Deverill
 Broad Blunsdon 
 Broad Chalke
 Broad Hinton 
 Broad Town
 Brokenborough
 Brokerswood
 Bromham
 Broughton Gifford 
 Brunton
 Bugley
 Bugmore
 Bulbridge
 Bulford
 Bulkington 
 Bullenhill
 Bupton
 Burbage 
 Burcombe
 Burderop
 Burton
 Bushton
 Buttermere

C

 Calne
 Castle Combe
 Castle Eaton
 Chapmanslade
 Charlton, Brinkworth
 Charlton, Pewsey Vale
 Charlton-All-Saints
 Cherhill
 Chicklade
 Chilmark
 Chilton Foliat
 Chippenham
 Chirton
 Chisbury
 Chiseldon
 Chitterne
 Chittoe
 Cholderton
 Christian Malford
 Chute Cadley
 Chute Forest
 Coate
 Codford
 Colerne
 Collingbourne Ducis
 Collingbourne Kingston
 Compton Bassett
 Compton Chamberlayne
 Coombe (near Donhead St Mary)
 Coombe (near Enford)
 Coombe Bissett 
 Corsham
 Corsley
 Corston, Wiltshire
 Coulston
 Covingham
 Cricklade
 Croucheston
 Crudwell

D

 Dauntsey
 Dauntsey Lock
 Devizes 
 Dilton Marsh
 Dinton 
 Ditteridge
 Donhead St Andrew
 Donhead St Mary 
 Downton 
 Durrington
 Derry Hill
 Draycot Cerne
 Draycot Foliat

E

 East Chisenbury 
 East Everleigh 
 East Grafton
 East Grimstead
 East Kennett
 East Knoyle 
 Easterton 
 Easton Grey
 Easton Royal 
 Ebbesbourne Wake
 Edington
 Enford 
 Erlestoke 
 Etchilhampton 
 Everleigh

F

 Figheldean
 Fifield 
 Fifield Bavant
 Firsdown
 Fisherton Delamere 
 Fittleton
 Fonthill Bishop
 Fonthill Gifford
 Ford (North Wiltshire)
 Ford (Laverstock and Ford)
 Fosbury
 Fovant 
 Foxham
 Foxley
 Froxfield 
 Fugglestone St Peter 
 Fyfield
 Fyfield (Pewsey)

G

 Gasper
 Goatacre
 Great Bedwyn 
 Great Chalfield 
 Great Cheverell
 Great Durnford
 Great Hinton
 Great Somerford
 Great Wishford
 Greatfield
 Green Hill, Wiltshire
 Grittleton
 Gastard

H

 Hannington
 Hannington Wick
 Haydon Wick
 Ham 
 Ham Hill 
 Hampton
 Hamptworth
 Harnham
 Hawkstreet 
 Haxton
 Hayes Knoll
 Heytesbury
 Heywood
 Highworth 
 Hilmarton
 Hilperton
 Hindon
 Hinton Parva
 Hodson
 Holt
 Honeystreet 
 Horningsham 
 Horton 
 Huish
 Hullavington

I
 Imber

K

 Keevil 
 Kilmington
 Kington Langley
 Kington St Michael 
 Knook

L

 Lacock
 Lacock Abbey
 Lake
 Langley Burrell
 Larkhill
 Laverstock
 Lea
 Leigh Delamere
 Liddington
 Limpley Stoke
 Little Bedwyn
 Little Cheverell
 Little Salisbury
 Little Somerford
 Littlecote House
 Littlecott
 Littleton Drew
 Littleworth
 Lockeridge
 Longbridge Deverill
 Longstreet
 Lover
 Lower Chute
 Lower Everleigh
 Lower Woodford
 Ludgershall
 Ludwell
 Lydeway
 Lydiard Millicent
 Lydiard Tregoze
 Lyneham

M

 Maddington
 Maiden Bradley
 Malmesbury 
 The Manningfords
 Manton 
 Marden 
 Market Lavington 
 Marlborough 
 Marlborough Downs 
 Marston
 Marston Meysey 
 Marten
 Melksham 
 Mere 
 Middle Woodford
 Milbourne
 Mile Elm
 Milton Lilbourne 
 Mildenhall
 Minety
 Monkton Farleigh
 Morgan's Vale
 Mountain Bower

N

 Neston
 Nettleton 
 Netherstreet
 Netheravon
 New Town
 New Zealand
 Nine Elms
 Nomansland
 North Bradley 
 North Tidworth
 North Wraxall
 Norton Bavant
 Notton
 Nunton

O

 Oare 
 Odstock
 Ogbourne St George
 Ogbourne St Andrew
 Ogbourne Maizey
 Old Dilton
 Oxenwood
 Oaksey

P

 Patney
 Perham Down
 Pertwood
 Pewsey 
 Pitton
 Potterne 
 Poulshot
 Poulton
 Purton
 Purton Stoke

R

 Ramsbury
 Redlynch
 Restrop
 Ridge 
 Rivar 
 Rockley
 Rollestone
 Roundway 
 Royal Wootton Bassett
 Rowde 
 Rushall

S

 St. Edith's Marsh
 Salisbury
 Sandridge
 Sandy Lane
 Seagry Heath
 Sedgehill
 Seend
 Sells Green
 Semley
 Sevenhampton
 Sevington
 Shalbourne
 Shaw
 Sherrington
 Sherston
 Shrewton
 Slaughterford
 Snap
 Sopworth
 South Marston
 South Newton
 Stanton St Bernard
 Stanton St Quintin
 Stapleford
 Startley
 Steeple Ashton
 Steeple Langford
 Stert
 Stitchcombe
 Stockley
 Stockton
 Stourton
 Stratford-sub-Castle
 Stratford Tony
 Stype
 Sutton Benger
 Sutton Mandeville
 Sutton Veny
 Swallowcliffe
 Swanborough
 Swindon

T

 Teffont Evias 
 Teffont Magna 
 The Shoe
 The Strand
 Tidcombe
 Tiddleywink 
 Tidworth
 Tilshead 
 Tisbury
 Tockenham
 Tollard Royal
 Trowbridge
 Tytherington

U

 Upavon 
 Upper Chute 
 Upper Seagry
 Upper Upham
 Upper Woodford
 Upper Wraxall
 Upton Lovell
 Upton Scudamore 
 Urchfont

V
 Vale of Pewsey

W

 Wanborough
 Wardour
 Warminster
 Washpool
 Wedhampton
 West Ashton
 West Chisenbury
 West Dean
 West Grafton
 West Grimstead
 West Kennett
 West Kington
 West Knoyle
 West Lavington
 West Overton
 West Stowell
 Westbrook
 Westbury
 Westwood
 Wexcombe
 Whaddon (near Salisbury)
 Whaddon (near Trowbridge)
 Whiteparish
 Whitley
 Widham
 Wilcot
 Wilsford (near Pewsey)
 Wilsford cum Lake
 Wilton (near Salisbury)
 Wilton (near Marlborough)
 Wingfield
 Winsley
 Winterbourne Bassett
 Winterbourne Dauntsey
 Winterbourne Earls
 Winterbourne Gunner
 Winterbourne Monkton
 Winterbourne Stoke
 Winterslow
 Woodborough
 Woodfalls
 Wootton Rivers
 Worton
 Wroughton
 Wylye

Y

 Yarnbrook
 Yatesbury
 Yatton Keynell

Z
 Zeals

See also
List of settlements in Wiltshire by population
List of civil parishes in Wiltshire
List of places in England

 
Wiltshire
Places in Wiltshire